Lip is the joint fourth studio album by Japanese rock band Sekai no Owari, released on February 27, 2019, by Toy's Factory. It was released simultaneously with the album Eye. The limited first run of the album contains a DVD featuring several of the band's music videos. The band will tour in support of the albums from April 2019. It debuted at number one on the Japanese Oricon Albums Chart on March 6.

Background
The band recorded enough material across the four years from their previous album Tree (2015), so decided to divide the material onto two discs, with Lip featuring the band's "signature pop" songs, and Eye showcasing their "wild side".

The songs "Hey Ho", "Error", "Mr. Heartache", "Rain", "Sasanqua" and "Illumination" were released prior to the album, with music videos accompanying several of the songs.

Promotion
"Illumination" was used as the theme song of the TV Asahi drama Legal V Ex-Lawyer Shoko Takanashi, while "Sasanqua" was used as the broadcast theme song of NHK's coverage of the 2018 Winter Paralympic Games.

Track listing

Notes
Nelson Babin-coy provided support as a consultant for English lyrics written in track 3.

Charts

Weekly charts

Year-end charts

References

2019 albums
Japanese-language albums
Sekai no Owari albums